Yuliya Mikhailovna Shamshurina (née Stepanova; born July 16, 1962) is a Soviet cross-country skier who competed from 1982 to 1989, training at VSS Urozhay in Ustinov. She won a silver medal in the 4x5 km at the 1989 FIS Nordic World Ski Championships in Lahti and had her best individual finish of fourth in the 10 km event at those same championships.

At the 1984 Winter Olympics in Sarajevo, Shamshurina (then known as Yuliya Stepanova), she finished fourth in the 4 × 5 km relay and had her best individual finish of eighth in the 10 km event.

Her lone career victory was in a 10 km event in Switzerland in 1988.

Cross-country skiing results
All results are sourced from the International Ski Federation (FIS).

Olympic Games

World Championships
 1 medal – (1 silver)

World Cup

Season standings

Individual podiums
1 victory 
1 podium

Team podiums
 1 podium 

Note:  Until the 1999 World Championships, World Championship races were included in the World Cup scoring system.

References

External links

World Championship results 

Cross-country skiers at the 1984 Winter Olympics
Russian female cross-country skiers
Soviet female cross-country skiers
Living people
1962 births
FIS Nordic World Ski Championships medalists in cross-country skiing